John Sandeman Allen may refer to:

 Sir John Sandeman Allen (Liverpool West Derby MP) (1865–1935), British Conservative Member of Parliament for Liverpool West Derby 1924–1935
 John Sandeman Allen (Birkenhead West MP) (1892–1949), British Conservative Member of Parliament Birkenhead West 1931–1945

See also 
John Allen (disambiguation)